Maxillaria palmifolia is a species of orchid that ranges from the Caribbean to Guyana.

References

External links 

palmifolia
Orchids of Guyana